Cornerstone Church may refer to:
 Christ the Cornerstone Church, Milton Keynes, UK
 Cornerstone Church (Toledo), United States
 Cornerstone Church (Nottingham), UK
 Cornerstone Church of Ames, Iowa, United States
 Cornerstone Church of San Diego, United States
 Cornerstone Community Church, Singapore
 Cornerstone Church (Nashville), United States